The Haikou dialect is a topolect of Chinese and a subvariety of Hainanese spoken in Haikou, the capital of the Hainan province and island of China.

Phonology 

The Haikou dialect has the following initials:

The finals are:

There are also two syllabic nasals, /m̩/ and /ŋ̍/.

The tone categories (described using Chao tone letters) are:

See also 
 Hainan Romanized

References

Sources 
 
 

Hainan Min